Mohammad Anwar Elahee  (9 July 1929 – 26 November 2010) was a Mauritian football player and manager who coached the Mauritian national team at the 1974 African Cup of Nations and the 1985 Indian Ocean Games.

He was appointed Member of the Order of the British Empire (MBE) in the 1970 New Year Honours for services to sport.

His son Mohammad Anwar Elahee, Jr. is active with the Mauritius Football Association.

References

1929 births
2010 deaths
People from Port Louis District
Mauritian footballers
Mauritius international footballers
Mauritian football managers
Mauritius national football team managers
1974 African Cup of Nations managers
Association football defenders
Members of the Order of the British Empire